The AS/NZS 3788 standard is a joint Australian and New Zealand Standard, for the inspection requirements of pressure equipment which aims to promote safety and uniformity throughout Australia and New Zealand.

Standard 3788 - Pressure Equipment-In-service inspection — is a standard published for the guidance of plant operating and inspection personnel on the inspection of pressure equipment. The standard was last updated in 2006, and is widely used in Australia as a reference for the inspection of pressure vessels, tanks, boilers, piping and other pieces of equipment.

References

Standards of Australia and New Zealand